The Encyclopedia of Triangle Centers (ETC) is an online list of thousands of points or "centers" associated with the geometry of a triangle. It is maintained by Clark Kimberling, Professor of Mathematics at the University of Evansville.

, the list identifies 52,440 triangle centers.

Each point in the list is identified by an index number of the form X(n)—for example, X(1) is the incenter. The information recorded about each point includes its trilinear and barycentric coordinates and its relation to lines joining other identified points. Links to The Geometer's Sketchpad diagrams are provided for key points. The Encyclopedia also includes a glossary of terms and definitions.

Each point in the list is assigned a unique name. In cases where no particular name arises from geometrical or historical considerations, the name of a star is used instead. For example, the 770th point in the list is named point Acamar.

The first 10 points listed in the Encyclopedia are:

{| class="wikitable"
|-
! ETC reference !! Name !! Definition
|-
! X(1)
| Incenter
|| center of the incircle
|-
! X(2)
| Centroid
|| intersection of the three medians
|-
! X(3)
| Circumcenter
|| center of the circumscribed circle
|-
! X(4)
| orthocenter
|| intersection of the three altitudes
|-
! X(5)
| nine-point center
|| center of the nine-point circle
|-
! X(6)
| symmedian point
|| intersection of the three symmedians
|-
! X(7)
| Gergonne point
|| symmedian point of contact triangle
|-
! X(8)
| Nagel point
|| intersection of lines from each vertex to the corresponding semiperimeter point
|-
! X(9)
| Mittenpunkt
|| symmedian point of the triangle formed by the centers of the three excircles
|-
! X(10)
| Spieker center
|| center of the Spieker circle
|}

Other points with entries in the Encyclopedia include:

{| class="wikitable"
|-
! ETC reference !! Name
|-
! X(11)
| Feuerbach point
|-
! X(13)
| Fermat point
|-
! X(15), X(16)
| first and second isodynamic points
|-
! X(17), X(18)
| first and second Napoleon points
|-
! X(19)
| Clawson point
|-
! X(20)
| de Longchamps point
|-
! X(21)
| Schiffler point
|-
! X(22)
| Exeter point
|-
! X(39)
| Brocard midpoint
|-
! X(40)
| Bevan point
|-
! X(175)
| Isoperimetric point
|-
! X(176)
| Equal detour point
|}

Similar, albeit shorter, lists exist for quadri-figures (quadrilaterals and systems of four lines) and polygon geometry. (See external links)

See also
 Catalogue of Triangle Cubics
List of triangle topics
Triangle center
The Secrets of Triangles
 Modern triangle geometry

References

External links

 Implementation of ETC points as Perl subroutines by Jason Cantarella

 Encyclopedia of Quadri-figures
Encyclopedia of Polygon Geometry

Triangle centers
Mathematical databases
20th-century encyclopedias
21st-century encyclopedias